José María Urrutia Manzano (1771–1848) was a Chilean military and politician. He was born in Concepción on 13 August 1771 and died on 17 December 1848. He was the son of José Francisco de Urrutia Mendiburi and María Luisa Fernández del Manzano y Guzmán Peralta. He married María de las Nieves Palacios y Pozo in Concepción.

Career
José María Urrutia Manzano began his career first in the military, becoming lieutenant colonel of Cavalry in 1804. He immediately took courses at the University of San Felipe, graduating with a Bachelor of Law and Philosophy in 1809.

He was Attorney General and Mayor of Concepción from 1809 to 1813.

He was elected alternate deputy for Concepción in 1831, but served instead as Senator for Biobío and Arauco from 1831 to 1846, as member of the Conservative Party. During this period, he was part of the Standing Committee on War and the Navy.

References 

1771 births
1848 deaths
People from Concepción, Chile
Chilean people of Basque descent
Conservative Party (Chile) politicians
Members of the Senate of Chile